Coleophora anabaseos is a moth of the family Coleophoridae. It is found in southern Russia and central Asia. It occurs in desert-steppe and desert biotopes.

Adults are on wing from end of May to June.

The larvae feed on Anabasis cretaceae, Anabasis elatior and Anabasis aphylla. They feed on the generative organs of their host plant.

References

anabaseos
Moths described in 1978
Moths of Asia